Railway budget of India was the Annual Financial Statement of the state-owned Indian Railways, which handles rail transport in India. It was presented every year by the Minister of Railways, representing the Ministry of Railways, in the Parliament.

The Railway Budget was presented every year, a few days before the Union budget, till 2016. Modi government on 21 September 2016 approved merger of the Rail and General budgets from next year, ending a 92-year-old practice of a separate budget for the nation’s largest transporter. Railways Minister Suresh Prabhu said that this merger proposal was in the long term interest of railways as well as the country’s economy and was a colonial practice that needed to be ended.

History
Following the recommendation of the Acworth Committee in 1920-21, headed by British railway economist William Acworth The "Acworth Report" led to reorganisation of railways, the railway finances were separated from the general government finances in 1924. After that in 1924 the budget was announced, a practice that continued till 2016.
 
John Matthai presented the first Railway Budget for independent India on 20th November 1947 which was interim Railway Budget and only after 3 months he presented his second Railway Budget on 24th February 1948  where revised estimates showed a fall in earnings of about 8 crores rupees as compared with the budget estimates.

Jagjivan Ram presented the railway budget most 7 times.

The first live telecast took place on 24 March 1994.

Lalu Prasad Yadav, who remained Railways Minister from 2004 to May 2009, presented the railway budget 6 times in a row. In 2009, under his tenure a  budget was passed.

In the year 1999, Mamata Banerjee (later Chief Minister of West Bengal) became the first female Railway Minister. In 2000, she became the first female to present the Railway budget and is the only woman to do so for two different governing coalitions (NDA and UPA).

In 2014 budget, Railway Minister D. V. Sadananda Gowda announced the first bullet train and 9 High-Speed Rail routes. 

The last Railway Budget was presented on 25 February 2016 by Mr. Suresh Prabhu.

Gallery 
Traditions included the Railway Minister making final changes to the budget, the railway minister carrying the briefcase with the budget documents, and an after budget press meet.

See also
Union budget of India
Military budget of India

References

Further reading 
 Railway Budget Speech 2010 Press Information Bureau, Govt. of India.
 Railway Budget, 2012-13 Press Information Bureau
 Railway Budget, 2013-14 Press Information Bureau

External links 
 Official website of the Ministry of Railways

Ministry of Railways (India)